Bilin Township is a township of Thaton District in the Mon State of Myanmar. Its seat is the town of Bilin. The Kelatha Wildlife Sanctuary is located 32 km from the Belin town. The Kaylartha Pagoda and monastery is visited by large number of pilgrims every year.

References 

Townships of Mon State